Istrati is a Romanian surname. Notable people with the surname include:

Alexandre Istrati, Franco-Romanian painter
Constantin Istrati, Romanian chemist and physician
Gavril Istrati, politician
Nicolae Istrati, politician
Panait Istrati, writer

Romanian-language surnames